Antea (also known as Portrait of a Young Woman) is a painting by the Italian Mannerist artist Parmigianino. The painting is in the collection of the Museum of Capodimonte in Naples, Italy.

History
The work is mentioned in 1671 as part of the Farnese collections in the Palazzo del Giardino. In the late 17th century, the painting was moved to the Ducal Gallery in the Palazzo della Pilotta in Parma. It has been in Naples since 1734, aside from a short period in 1816-1817 at Palermo. During World War II it was moved to Montecassino, where it was stolen by the occupying German forces and brought to Berlin, and then to the Austrian salt mines of Altaussee, from where it returned to Italy in 1945.

The subject of the painting remains largely a mystery. In 1671, Giacomo Barri, an artist and writer, referred to the woman as "Antea", the name of a famous 16th-century Roman courtesan, and stated she was the artist's mistress.  This identification has long been contested. Studies of the woman's garments, a mix of luxury and popular elements, have led to the hypothesis that she could be either the artist's daughter, a lover, or a servant of Parmigianino, if not Pellegrina Rossi di San Secondo or another unknown noblewoman of Parma. Art historian Elizabeth Cropper has written about the painting in the context of the extensive Italian Renaissance discourse on the specific traits and qualities of ideal female beauty.

See also
Turkish Slave

References

Sources

External links
Page at the museum's website  

Paintings by Parmigianino
Paintings in the collection of the Museo di Capodimonte
1530s paintings
Portraits of women
Farnese Collection